A Walk Among the Tombstones is a 1992 crime thriller novel by Lawrence Block. It is the tenth novel to feature Matthew Scudder, an ex cop and private investigator.

The film adaptation of the novel was released on September 19, 2014. It was written and directed by Scott Frank, with Liam Neeson playing the lead role.

References

American crime novels
American novels adapted into films
Novels by Lawrence Block
1992 American novels